Dave Fogg is an American DJ and record producer born in Las Vegas, Nevada. He was a program director and now resident DJ at XS Nightclub in Las Vegas. XS Nightclub was voted Number 1 in the Nightclub & Bar Top 100. Located in Encore Las Vegas, other DJs and producers have held residences at Encore's nightclubs, like David Guetta and Avicii. He has shared stage with artists like Diplo, Oakenfold, Pete Tong, Afrojack, Rusko, Z-Trip and many more.

Biography
He has always worked in Las Vegas, except for short periods in San Diego and Los Angeles, working for Warner Bros. Records, Polygram Records, and rapper RBX.
Dave has been a producer and composer for artists like RBX on his album The RBX Files, and was part of two DJs collectives; Teflon Dons and Inhumanz. With the latter he released a series of LP called “Satanic Mash-ups”, mixing rap with metal music. One of their tracks, Shoot the war pigs, mixing Black Sabbath and NAS was chosen nº2 on Rolling Stone’s Hot List and as a featured download in Spin Magazine

He started mixing music in college, shortly after he began to play at house parties and sport bars in the late 1980s. In 2002, he started at Whiskey Sky, Green Valley Ranch as program director and resident DJ. He would go on to have DJ residencies at the Hard Rock Hotel, Ra Nightclub, Tryst Nightclub and N9NE Group as program director in 2010. In 2011 he returned to XS. In 2003, he appeared in CSI Las Vegas’ episode "Lady Heather's Box" as Lord Create DJ
He has also been in production groups like Inhumanz and Teflon Dons, whose EP Rudiments was featured in Billboard Magazine described as “too smooth and engaging”.

Discography
1995 The RBX Files (composer).
Teflon Dons 
EP
1996 Rudiments
1998 WMC ’98 Music Sampler
1998 Psycho Ray
1999 Tomorrow People
2000 L-O-V-E
2003 The Rendezvous
2012 Worldship Music EP
Inhumanz
EP
Satanik Mashups Vol. I – V
(2003) 50 Inch Nails 
Satanik Mashups Vol. 666
LP
Inhumanz vs Dilated
(2003) Hell to Pay

References

Living people
American DJs
Record producers from Nevada
Musicians from Las Vegas
Year of birth missing (living people)